Horse Island is the name of several places, including:

Canada
Horse Islands (Newfoundland and Labrador)
Horse Island (Lake Winnipeg), Manitoba

Ireland
Horse Island, County Clare
Horse Island, County Cork
Horse Island, County Kerry

United Kingdom

Northern Ireland
Horse Island, County Down, a townland of County Down
Horse Island, County Fermanagh, a townland of County Fermanagh

Scotland
Horse Isle in the Firth of Clyde, North Ayrshire
Horse Island, Summer Isles in the Summer Isles
Horse Holm in the Shetland Islands, sometimes shown as Horse Island

United States
Horse Island (Connecticut)
Horse Island (Maryland)
Horse Island (Michigan)
Horse Island (New Mexico)
Horse Island (New York), site of the Horse Island Light in Sackets Harbor, New York
Horse Island (Rockville, South Carolina), listed in the National Register of Historic Places
Horse Island (Texas)

See also
Wild Horse Island, Montana
Hrossey (meaning "horse island"), the old name of Mainland, Orkney, Scotland
 Eilean nan Each (Horse Island), Small Isles, Scotland
Hestur ("Horse" in Faroese), an island in the Faroe Islands
Horsey Island (disambiguation)